Saidamin Solikhujaev is a hygienist, doctor of medical sciences, professor and honored doctor of the Uzbek SSR.

Biography 
Saidamin Solikhujaev was born on September 5, 1927, in Tashkent.

After graduating from Tashkent Medical Institute in 1948, he started working as the head of hospital between 1948 and 1951 years. In 1968 he became the honored doctor of Uzbekistan USSR and after three years he became the head of "Central Asian Pediatrics medicine academy of hygiene". In the same year he was honored as the professor and introduced his dissertation on topic "Clinic functional changes and hygiene of people who work with Wolfram implementation in Uzbekistan".

Saidamin Solikhujaev died on December 13, 2007.

Books
"Hygiene for adults"

"Clinic functional changes and hygiene of people who work with Wolfram implementation in Uzbekistan"

"Hygiene of labor in growing and processing of jute and deccan hemp in Uzbekistan"

References

Uzbek Soviet Socialist Republic people
Physicians from Tashkent
Soviet physicians
1927 births
2007 deaths